State Highway 77 (SH-77) is a state highway in Cassia County, Idaho.

Route description

State Highway 77 begins at an intersection with SH-81 in Malta, located north of the Utah state line. The highway travels west from Malta along Cassia Creek, bordered to the south by the Jim Sage Mountains and to the north by the Cottrel Mountains, to Connor Creek. At Connor Creek, a spur route of SH-77 splits off to serve the City of Rocks National Reserve and Almo, while the main highway turns north. SH-77 turns northwest along the ridge of the Albion Mountains and passes through the town of Albion on its way to the Magic Valley. The highway accesses the valley via a small mountain pass and turns travels due north through Declo, where it intersects SH-81. North of Declo, SH-77 terminates at an interchange with Interstate 84 adjacent to the Snake River; the roadway continues north as SH-25, heading towards Rupert.

From Connor Creek to Albion, SH-77 forms part of the City of Rocks Back Country Byway, a  scenic byway serving the City of Rocks National Reserve that travels from Albion to Oakley.

Major intersections

Spur route

ID-77 has a spur route that travels  between Almo and the main highway at Connor Creek, via Elba. The highway serves the City of Rocks National Reserve and is part of the City of Rocks Back Country Byway. The byway follows the route of the California Trail as it approached Nevada.

References

077
Transportation in Cassia County, Idaho